Mudhal Idam is a 2011 Indian Tamil romantic comedy film written and directed by newcomer R. Kumaran. The film, starring Vidharth of Mynaa fame along with debutante Kavitha Nair, is notably AVM Productions' 175th production.

Plot
Mahesh (Vidharth) is a thug in Thanjavur whose only ambition is to emerge as the Number 1 rowdy with his name topping the list of wanted criminals in the local police station.  He is called 'Yamakunji' (junior lord of dead) by his friends, for he wants to send fear in the spine of his opponents. He indulges in all unlawful activities to achieve his mission. For his mother (Kalairani), he is the best son on earth. She earns her livelihood running an idly shop. Mahesh meets Mythili (Kavitha Nair), a school student and daughter of a bus conductor Ponnusamy (Ilavarasu). Mythili falls for him; however, Ponnusamy opposes their affair. Things take a turn when Karuppu Balu (Kishore), the number one rowdy in the area, comes out of jail. Mahesh incurs the wrath of the aspiring MLA for no fault of his. Things take a turn when Mythili elopes from her house and Mahesh is forced to kill Balu. The movie ends with a strong message.

Cast

 Vidharth as Mahesh
 Mohana (Kannada) as Mythili
 Kishore as Karuppu Balu
 Kalairani as Mahesh's mother
 Ilavarasu as Ponnusamy
 Gadam Kishan as Dinesh
 Appukutty
 Ponnambalam
 Thirumurugan
 Manobala
 Namo Narayana
 Mayilsamy
 Keerthi Chawla

Soundtrack
The soundtrack was composed by D. Imman.

Reception
Sify wrote "The plot is hackneyed and there is nothing new or gripping about rowdy elements wanting to become MLA. The film just does not qualify to be in the race for the first place as the title indicates." Behindwoods wrote "Mudhal Idam is a fair effort which is let down by a script which has its punches distributed unevenly. There are moments of fun and excitement, but they are interspersed by stretches of meandering scenes." Nowrunning wrote "Mudhal Idam is a brain-dead film with, too many songs, too many fight sequences, inconsequential village politics and high-handed sermonizing about true masculinity."

References

External links

2011 films
2010s Tamil-language films
AVM Productions films